Frank Barkow (born 1957) is an American architect. His practice Barkow Leibinger, founded with his partner Regine Leibinger, is known for industrial architecture (e.g.Trumpf Campus in Farmington, CT and in Stuttgart), domestic and cultural projects (e.g. the Biosphere in Potsdam and Fellows Pavilion for the American Academy in Berlin), as well as for the two landmark office towers, the TRUTEC Building in Seoul (2006) and the Tour Total in Berlin (2012).

Both Barkow and Leibinger favor a material architecture, a conviction that architectural ideas and materials are inherently related and interconnected. This allows their work to respond to advancing knowledge and technology as well as to the handcrafted, and thus explore new materials and their applications.

Education and career
Frank Barkow studied architecture at Montana State University and at Harvard GSD under the chairmanship of Rafael Moneo. While at Harvard, he met Regine Leibinger, a German architect. In 1993, Frank and Regine founded Barkow Leibinger in Berlin, Germany.

Academic
Frank Barkow teaches at the Harvard GSD. Previously he was visiting professor at the Royal College of Art in London, the EPFL, the Architectural Association in London and Cornell University Ithaca, NY, among others. In 2007 he taught at the University of Wisconsin, Milwaukee as part of the Marcus Prize, an international prize for emerging talent in architecture. He held lectures at the Monterey Design Conference, the Walter Gropius Symposium at Bauhaus Dessau, the Alvar Aalto Symposium at the University of Jyväskylä in Helsinki.   Further lectures include the UDK Berlin, MoMA New York, Washington University in St. Louis, Rice University in Houston, American Academy Berlin, Nottingham Contemporary UK, USC School of Architecture in Los Angeles, Macintosh School of Architecture in Glasgow, Pratt Institute School of Architecture in New York, AA School of Architecture in London, Städelschule in Frankfurt am Main, The Architectural League in New York, Yale University School of Architecture in New Haven, University of Pennsylvania in Philadelphia, ETH Zürich and Cornell University in Ithaca, among others.

Research and publications
With the AA London, Barkow Leibinger published “An Atlas of Fabrication”  - a compilation of architectural research, as well as “Bricoleur/Bricolage”  - which led Hal Foster, Princeton, to following statement in the most recent publication “Spielraum”:

“In the end Barkow Leibinger are bricoleurs as much as they are engineers. ... There is always an element of inspired performance in bricolage. And as the greatest philosophers in German aesthetics tell us, such play (Spiel) is also essential to art; it opens up a realm for an imaginative response to any question. In the end, this is what Barkow Leibinger offer us all: Spielraum, room for play, space for invention.“

Exhibitions, collections and prizes
Barkow Leibinger's work has been widely exhibited, national and internationally, including the Architecture Biennale in Venice 2008   and 2014, the 4th Marrakech Biennial "Higher Atlas", the Pinakothek der Moderne Munich, Oslo Architecture Triennale, DAM Frankfurt, MoMA New York, 032c  Berlin, AA London, among others. Frank Barkow co-curated the exhibition of twelve Berlin based architecture practices "How Soon is Now" at Judin Gallery Berlin in 2014.
Barkow Leibinger's work is included in the permanent collections of MoMA, New York, and the Deutsches Architektur Museum, Frankfurt. They have won three National AIA Honor Awards for Architecture [1] and the Marcus Prize for Architecture, Milwaukee, among others.

Selected projects 
 Day-care Center, Berlin Buchholz, 1997/1998
 Customer and Training Center, Farmington, Connecticut, USA, 1999
 Biosphere, Potsdam, 2001
 Customer and Administration Building, Ditzingen, 2003
 Grüsch Pavillon I and II, Grüsch, Switzerland, 2001/2004
 Training Center with Cafeteria, Neukirch, 2005
 Trutec Building, Seoul, Korea, 2006
 Gate House, Ditzingen, 2007
 Campus Restaurant, Ditzingen, 2008
 Laser Factory, Farmington, Connecticut, USA, 2008
 Office Building with Training Workshop, Hettingen, 2009
 Development Center, Ditzingen, 2009
 Site Master Plan Bayer Schering Pharma, Berlin, 2010
 Stadthaus M1 Vauban, Freiburg im Breisgau, 2012 
 Tour Total Berlin, 2012
 Estrel Tower Berlin, competition 2014, 1. prize
 Fraunhofer Research Campus, Waischenfeld, 2014
 Fellows Pavilion, American Academy in Berlin, 2015
 Aufbau Haus 84, 2015

Publications (selection) 
 Cultivating the Landscape, Editor Galerie Aedes, Berlin, exhibition catalogue, 1999
 Werkbericht 1993–2001 / Workreport Barkow Leibinger, Editor George Wagner, Basel, Birkhäuser, 2001
 Barkow Leibinger Architects Works | Opere BY 7, Editor Marcella Gallotta, Melfi: Casa Editrice Librìa, 2004
 Barkow Leibinger Architects C3, Editor Uje Lee, Seoul, Korea, 2007
 Reflect - Building in the Digital Media City, Seoul, Korea, Hrsg. Andres Lepik, Hatje Cantz, Ostfildern, 2007
 An Atlas of Fabrication, Editor Pamela Johnson, AA Publication, London, 2009
 Bricoleur/Bricolage, AA Publications, London 2013
 Spielraum, Hatje Cantz, Berlin, 2014

References

External links 
 Barkow Leibinger official website

1957 births
American architects
Living people
Harvard Graduate School of Design alumni
Montana State University alumni